Zagojiči (in older sources also Sagojiči) is a small settlement in the Municipality of Gorišnica in northeastern Slovenia. The area traditionally belonged to the Styria region. It is now included in the Drava Statistical Region.

There is a small Neo-Gothic chapel-shrine with a metal belfry in the settlement. It was built in the early 20th century.

References

External links
Zagojiči on Geopedia

Populated places in the Municipality of Gorišnica